Karaikal taluk is a taluk of Karaikal District of Puducherry, India. It consists of one municipality, Karaikal and the following revenue villages:

 Poovam
 Thiruvettakudy
 Varichikudy
 Kil Vanjiyur
 Mel Vanjiyur
 Keezhaiyur
 Polagam

Apart from the above revenue villages, Karaikal taluk includes the following commune panchayats.

 Neravy
 Tirumalarajanpattinam
 Kottucheri

The taluk headquarters is located at Karaikal.

See also
Konnakavaly

Taluks of Karaikal district